Conopyga is a genus of moths in the family Sesiidae.

Species
Conopyga metallescens  Felder, 1861

References

Sesiidae